Below is the list of populated places in Karaman Province, Turkey by the districts. In the following lists first place in each list is the administrative center of the district.

Karaman 

Karaman
Ada, Karaman
Ağaçyurdu, Karaman
Ağılönü, Karaman
Akçaalan, Karaman
Akçaşehir, Karaman
Akpınar, Karaman
Alaçatı, Karaman
Aşağıakın, Karaman
Aşağıkızılca, Karaman
Aybastı, Karaman
Bademli, Karaman
Barutkavuran, Karaman
Başharman, Karaman
Başkışla, Karaman
Bayır, Karaman
Beydili, Karaman
Bostanözü, Karaman
Boyalı, Karaman
Boyalıtepe, Karaman
Bozkandak, Karaman
Bölükyazı, Karaman
Bucakkışla, Karaman
Burhan, Karaman
Burunoba, Karaman
Cerit, Karaman
Çakırbağ, Karaman
Çatak, Karaman
Çavuşpınarı, Karaman
Çiğdemli, Karaman
Çimenkuyu, Karaman
Çoğlu, Karaman
Çukur, Karaman
Çukurbağ, Karaman
Dağkonak, Karaman
Damlapınar, Karaman
Değirmenbaşı, Karaman
Demiryurt, Karaman
Dere, Karaman
Dinek, Karaman
Eğilmez, Karaman
Ekinözü, Karaman
Elmadağı, Karaman
Eminler, Karaman
Erenkavak, Karaman
Göçer, Karaman
Gökçe, Karaman
Göztepe, Karaman
Güçler, Karaman
Güldere, Karaman
Gülkaya, Karaman
Hamidiye, Karaman
İhsaniye, Karaman
İslihisar, Karaman
Kalaba, Karaman
Karacaören, Karaman
Kaşoba, Karaman
Kılbasan, Karaman
Kızık, Karaman
Kızıllarağını, Karaman
Kızılyaka, Karaman
Kisecik, Karaman
Kozlubucak, Karaman
Kurtderesi, Karaman
Kurucabel, Karaman
Lale, Karaman
Madenşehri, Karaman
Medreselik, Karaman
Mesudiye, Karaman
Morcalı, Karaman
Muratdede, Karaman
Narlıdere, Karaman
Ortaoba, Karaman
Osmaniye, Karaman
Özdemir, Karaman
Paşabağı, Karaman
Pınarbaşı, Karaman
Salur, Karaman
Sarıkaya, Karaman
Sazlıyaka, Karaman
Seyithasan, Karaman
Sudurağı, Karaman
Süleymanhacı, Karaman
Şeyhler, Karaman
Tarlaören, Karaman
Taşkale, Karaman
Tavşanlı, Karaman
Üçbaş, Karaman
Üçkuyu, Karaman
Yazılı, Karaman
Yeşildere, Karaman
Yılangömü, Karaman
Yollarbaşı, Karaman
Yukarıakın, Karaman
Yukarıkızılca, Karaman
Yuvatepe, Karaman

Ayrancı 

Ayrancı
Ağızboğaz, Ayrancı
Akpınar, Ayrancı
Ambar, Ayrancı
Berendi, Ayrancı
Böğecik, Ayrancı
Buğdaylı, Ayrancı
Büyükkoraş, Ayrancı
Çatköy, Ayrancı
Dokuzyol, Ayrancı
Hüyükburun, Ayrancı
Kaleköy, Ayrancı
Karaağaç, Ayrancı
Kavaközü, Ayrancı
Kavuklar, Ayrancı
Kayaönü, Ayrancı
Kıraman, Ayrancı
Küçükkoraş, Ayrancı
Melikli, Ayrancı
Pınarkaya, Ayrancı
Sarayköy, Ayrancı
Üçharman, Ayrancı
Yarıkkuyu, Ayrancı

Başyayla 

Başyayla
Bozyaka, Başyayla
Büyükkarapınar, Başyayla
Kışlaköy, Başyayla
Üzümlü, Başyayla

Ermenek 

Ermenek
Ağaççatı, Ermenek
Ardıçkaya, Ermenek
Aşağıçağlar, Ermenek
Balkusan, Ermenek
Boyalık, Ermenek
Çamlıca, Ermenek
Çavuş, Ermenek
Elmayurdu, Ermenek
Eskice, Ermenek
Evsin, Ermenek
Gökceseki, Ermenek
Gökçekent, Ermenek
Görmeli, Ermenek
Güneyyurt, Ermenek
İkizçınar, Ermenek
Katranlı, Ermenek
Kayaönü, Ermenek
Kazancı, Ermenek
Olukpınar, Ermenek
Pamuklu, Ermenek
Pınarönü, Ermenek
Sarıvadi, Ermenek
Tepebaşı, Ermenek
Yalındal, Ermenek
Yaylapazarı, Ermenek
Yerbağ, Ermenek
Yeşilköy, Ermenek
Yukarıçağlar, Ermenek

Kazımkarabekir 

Kazımkarabekir
Akarköy, Kazımkarabekir
Karalgazi, Kazımkarabekir
Kızılkuyu, Kazımkarabekir
Mecidiye, Kazımkarabekir
Özyurt, Kazımkarabekir
Sinci, Kazımkarabekir

Sarıveliler

Sarıveliler
Civandere, Sarıveliler
Civler, Sarıveliler
Çevrekavak, Sarıveliler
Daran, Sarıveliler
Dumlugöze, Sarıveliler
Esentepe, Sarıveliler
Göktepe, Sarıveliler
Günder, Sarıveliler
Işıklı, Sarıveliler
Koçaşlı, Sarıveliler
Uğurlu, Sarıveliler

References

Karaman Province
Karaman
List